Om Prakash Jindal (7 August 1930 – 31 March 2005), popularly known as O.P. Jindal, was born in Hisar, Haryana. He established a successful business enterprise Jindal Steel and Power under the flagship of the Jindal Organization, of which he was the chairman. In November 2004, Jindal was awarded the "Life Time Achievement Award" for his outstanding contribution to the Indian Steel Industry by the Bengal Chamber of Commerce and Industry. According to the latest Forbes List, he was ranked 13th amongst the richest Indians and placed 548th amongst the richest persons of the world. He died in a helicopter crash on 31 March 2005.

Jindal was appointed Minister of Power in the Government of Haryana. He won the Hisar Legislative Assembly seat of Haryana three times consecutively. He was also a Member of the Committee on Food, Civil Supplies and Public Distribution from 1996 to 1997.

Jindal was elected to the Haryana Vidhan Sabha (the Haryana state assembly) in February 2005 and was the Minister of Power in the Government of Haryana at the time of his death. He was the Chairman of the N.C. Jindal Charitable Trust; Patron and Trustee of Agroha Vikas Trust and Agroha Medical College.

His four sons, Prithviraj Jindal, Sajjan Jindal, Ratan Jindal and Naveen Jindal now run the steel and power empire. His widow Savitri Jindal was Minister of State for Revenue, Disaster Management, Rehabilitation and Housing in Haryana state government, while his son Naveen was a member of the Parliament of India. His granddaughter Sminu Jindal is Managing Director of Jindal SAW and founder of Svayam.

See also 
 O. P. Jindal Global University
 O.P. Jindal University
 Vidya Devi Jindal School

References

External links
Official website
Official website

1930 births
2005 deaths
Businesspeople from Haryana
Indian National Congress politicians from Haryana
People from Hisar (city)
Victims of helicopter accidents or incidents
Victims of aviation accidents or incidents in India
Haryana Vikas Party politicians
Members of the Haryana Legislative Assembly
India MPs 1996–1997
Lok Sabha members from Haryana
People from Kurukshetra district
Jindal family